American Dreams is a studio album by American country music group The Oak Ridge Boys. It was released in 1989 via MCA Records. The album peaked at number 24 on the Billboard Top Country Albums chart. It includes the singles "An American Family" and "No Matter How High", the latter of which was the group's last number one hit on Hot Country Songs. "Turning for Home" later served as the title track to Mike Reid's 1991 debut album Turning for Home.

The album cover shows The Oak Ridge Boys standing in the seats along the left field line of Nashville, Tennessee's, Herschel Greer Stadium. Richard Sterban was a minority shareholder of the Nashville Sounds, who played their home games at Greer.

Track listing

Personnel

The Oak Ridge Boys
Duane Allen - lead vocals
Joe Bonsall - tenor vocals
Steve Sanders - baritone vocals
Richard Sterban - bass vocals

Additional musicians
Paul Barrere - electric guitar on "Cajun Girl"
Sam Clayton - tambourine on "Cajun Girl"
Dewey Dorough - saxophone
Kenny Gradney - bass guitar on "Cajun Girl"
Richie Hayward - drums on "Cajun Girl"
Shane Keister - synthesizer
Wade Benson Landry - fiddle
Mike Lawler - synthesizer
Paul Leim - drums, percussion
Bill Payne - keyboards on "Cajun Girl"
Matt Rollings - piano
Leland Sklar - bass guitar
Fred Tackett - acoustic guitar on "Cajun Girl"
Billy Joe Walker Jr. - acoustic guitar, electric guitar
Reggie Young - electric guitar

Chart performance

References

1989 albums
The Oak Ridge Boys albums
MCA Records albums
Albums produced by Jimmy Bowen